Mohammad Aghajanpour (born April 20, 1997) is an Iranian football defender who currently plays for Iranian club Mes Rafsanjan in the Persian Gulf Pro League.

References

1997 births
Living people
Iranian footballers
Shahr Khodro F.C. players
Association football defenders
Footballers at the 2018 Asian Games
Asian Games competitors for Iran
Mes Rafsanjan players
Aluminium Arak players
People from Babol
Sportspeople from Mazandaran province
21st-century Iranian people